Jussara is a genus of harvestmen in the family Sclerosomatidae from South America.

Species
 Jussara argentatus (Roewer, 1953)
 Jussara ater (Roewer, 1910)
 Jussara dentatus (Roewer, 1910)
 Jussara diadematus Thorell, 1891
 Jussara lineatus (Roewer, 1953)
 Jussara luteovariatus (Mello-Leitão, 1931)
 Jussara obesa Mello-Leitão, 1935
 Jussara quadrimaculatus (Roewer, 1953)
 Jussara roseus (Nello-Leitao, 1940)
 Jussara sigillatus (Mello-Leitão, 1944)

References

Harvestman genera